The 127th Queen Mary's Own Baluch Light Infantry was an infantry regiment of the British Indian Army raised in 1844 as The Scinde Bellochee Corps. It was designated as the 127th Baluch Light Infantry in 1903 and became 3rd Battalion (Queen Mary's Own) 10th Baluch Regiment in 1922. In 1947, it was allocated to the Pakistan Army, where it continues to exist as the 10th Battalion of The Baloch Regiment.

Early history
In 1843, the British conquered Sindh after defeating the ruling confederacy of Baloch chieftains. General Sir Charles Napier, the British commander, was much impressed by the ferocious courage of his Balochi opponents and decided to recruit two irregular battalions of Bombay Army for local service within Sindh. The first of these was raised at Karachi as the Scinde Bellochee Corps or the Bellochee Battalion by Major F. Jackson in 1844. Its manpower was mostly drawn from Balochis, Sindhis and Pathans from Sindh. Later, it also recruited Brahuis and Punjabi Muslims, while the recruitment area was extended to include Baluchistan, North-West Frontier Province and the Punjab. On the raising of the 2nd Battalion in 1846, the regiment was designated as the 1st Belooch Battalion. When the Indian Mutiny broke out in 1857, the 1st Belooch Battalion under Lieutenant Colonel Farquhar was dispatched across the Sindh desert to join the Delhi Field Force. It was engaged in several actions during the siege and capture of Delhi. During the next two years, it fought in numerous engagements in Oudh and Rohilkhand, as the British systematically stamped out all resistance. The regiment was brought into line for its services in North India as the 27th Regiment of Bombay Native Infantry or the 1st Belooch Regiment. In 1868, it took part in the long and arduous Expedition to Abyssinia. The splendid performance of 1st Belooch Regiment in Abyssinia was much appreciated and as a reward, it was converted into Light Infantry. In 1879-80, the 1st Beloochees participated in the Second Afghan War, followed by the Third Burmese War of 1885-87, where they earned the nickname of Capital Campaigners for their excellent performance. In 1897-99, the regiment was sent to British East Africa to quell an insurgency in areas now forming Uganda.

127th Queen Mary's Own Baluch Light Infantry
Subsequent to the reforms brought about in the Indian Army by Lord Kitchener in 1903, all former Bombay Army units had 100 added to their numbers. Consequently, the regiment's designation was changed to 127th Baluch Light Infantry. In 1906, the Princess of Wales (later Queen Mary) was appointed Colonel-in-Chief of the regiment. The regimental full dress uniform in 1914 included a rifle green turban and kurta (knee length tunic) piped in red, worn with red trousers and white gaiters. The red trousers were a distinctive feature of all five Baluch infantry regiments then serving in the Indian Army. 
On the outbreak of the First World War, the regiment served in German East Africa and Persia. In 1918, it raised the 2nd Battalion 127th Queen Mary's Own Baluch Light Infantry, which served in the Palestine and took part in the Battle of Megiddo that led to the defeat of the Turkish Army in Palestine. The 2nd Battalion was disbanded in 1921.

Subsequent History
In 1922, the regiment was grouped with five other Baluch battalions: 1st & 2nd Battalions of 124th Duchess of Connaught's Own Baluchistan Infantry, 126th Baluchistan Infantry, 129th Duke of Connaught's Own Baluchis and the 130th King George's Own Baluchis (Jacob's Rifles), to form the 10th Baluch Regiment. The 127th Queen Mary's Own Baluch Light Infantry was redesignated as the 3rd Battalion (Queen Mary's Own) 10th Baluch Regiment. During the Second World War, 3/10th Baluch served in Iran, Iraq, North Africa, Sicily, Italy and Greece. In 1946, it was selected for conversion into an airborne battalion, but the events of 1947 intervened and on the Partition of India, the battalion, along with the Baluch Regiment was allocated to Pakistan Army. In 1956, on the merger of 8th Punjab and Bahawalpur Regiments with the Baluch Regiment, 3 Baluch was redesignated as 10 Baluch (now 10 Baloch). During the Indo-Pakistani Wars of 1965 and 1971, the battalion fought with distinction in Kashmir and took part in the capture of Chhamb in 1971.

Genealogy
1844 -	Bellochee Battalion or The Scinde Bellochee Corps
1846 -	1st Bellochee Battalion 
1858 -	1st Belooch Extra Battalion Bombay Native Infantry
1859 -	1st Belooch Regiment Bombay Native Infantry
1861 -	27th Regiment Bombay Native Infantry or 1st Belooch Regiment
1871 -	27th Regiment Bombay Native (Light) Infantry or 1st Belooch Regiment
1885 -	27th Regiment Bombay (Light) Infantry or 1st Belooch Regiment
1888 -	27th Regiment (1st Belooch Battalion) Bombay (Light) Infantry
1892 -	27th Regiment (1st Baluch Battalion) Bombay (Light) Infantry or 27th Baluchis
1901 -	27th Baluch Light Infantry
1903 -	127th Baluch Light Infantry
1906 -	127th Princess of Wales's Own Baluch Light Infantry
1910 -	127th Queen Mary's Own Baluch Light Infantry
1918 -	1st Battalion 127th Queen Mary's Own Baluch Light Infantry
1921 -	127th Queen Mary's Own Baluch Light Infantry
1922 -	3rd Battalion (Queen Mary's Own) 10th Baluch Regiment or 3/10th Baluch
1945 -	3rd Battalion (Queen Mary's Own) The Baluch Regiment or 3 Baluch
1946 -	3rd (Para) Battalion (Queen Mary's Own) The Baluch Regiment
1947 -	3rd Battalion (Queen Mary's Own) The Baluch Regiment
1956 -	10th Battalion The Baluch Regiment or 10 Baluch
1991 -	10th Battalion The Baloch Regiment or 10 Baloch

References

Further reading
 Ahmad, Lt Col Rifat Nadeem. (2010). Battle Honours of the Baloch Regiment. Abbottabad: The Baloch Regimental Centre.
 Ahmed, Maj Gen Rafiuddin. (1998). History of the Baloch Regiment 1820-1939. Abbottabad: The Baloch Regimental Centre. 
 Ahmed, Maj Gen Rafiuddin. (2000). History of the Baloch Regiment 1939-1956. Abbottabad: The Baloch Regimental Centre. 
 Barthorp, Michael, & Jeffrey Burn. (1979). Indian Infantry Regiments 1860–1914. Osprey Publishing. 
 Cadell, Sir Patrick. (1938). History of the Bombay Army. London: Longmans & Green
Gaylor, John (1992). Sons of John Company: Indian and Pakistan Armies, 1903-1991, Spellmount Publishers Ltd. .
 Maxwell, Lt Col WE. (1948). Capital Campaigners: The History of the 3rd Battalion (Queen Mary’s Own) the Baluch Regiment. Aldershot: Gale & Polden.

External links
127th Baluch Light Infantry (Queen Mary's Own) at The British Empire
History of the Baloch Regiment 1820–1939 the Colonial Period, text of pages 1 to 15 available online as download preview

See also
10th Baluch Regiment
The Baloch Regiment
Siege of Delhi
1868 Expedition to Abyssinia 
British East Africa 1897-99

Baloch Regiment
British Indian Army infantry regiments
Military units and formations established in 1903
Military units and formations disestablished in 1922